Stansted Airport railway station is on a branch line off the West Anglia Main Line in the east of England and was opened in 1991 to provide a rail link to London Stansted Airport. It is  down the line from London Liverpool Street station, to which a frequent dedicated service called the Stansted Express operates.

The short branch line was constructed at a cost of £44 million and opened by British Rail to coincide with the completion of the airport's new terminal building.

Layout
Platforms 1 and 3 run the full length of the station and are used for Stansted Express and  services. The shorter platform number 2 is used for the CrossCountry-operated services to Birmingham New Street.

In 2011 platform 1 was extended to accommodate two trains simultaneously in combinations of up to 16 coaches, and platform 2 was extended to accommodate four-coach trains.

The station is in a concrete box structure that is unusually above ground level rather than below ground, being constructed under the terminal building. This is evident at the western end of the platforms which are left open and is a similar design to Wembley Central railway station.

Services

Services at Stansted Airport are operated by Greater Anglia (including services under the Stansted Express brand) and CrossCountry.

The typical off-peak service in trains per hour is:
 2 tph to London Liverpool Street
 1 tph to  via 
 1 tp2h to  via Cambridge and

References

External links
 

Stansted Airport Trains

Railway stations in Essex
DfT Category B stations
Railway stations opened by British Rail
Railway stations in Great Britain opened in 1991
Railway stations served by CrossCountry
Railway station
Greater Anglia franchise railway stations
Airport railway stations in the United Kingdom
1991 establishments in England